The Four Poster is a 1964 Australian television play based on the play The Fourposter by Jan de Hartog. It starred Anne Haddy and Alistair Duncan and was directed by James Upshaw.

Cast
Anne Haddy as Agnes
Alistair Duncan as Michael

Production
It was one of 20 TV plays produced by the ABC in 1964, 

It was filmed in Sydney and was the first televised play to feature only two characters

Reception
The critic from the Sydney Morning Herald said "there is no point in pretending that" the play was "important or even honest" being essentially "a family radio serial... but  as an exercise in the capacities of two performers to turn from newly married youngsters into nostalgic or ghostly elders, it retains at least a sporting interest."

The Age called it "a treat".

References

External links
 

1964 television plays
1960s Australian television plays
Australian films based on plays
1960s English-language films